Francisco Sánchez de la Fuente (died September 1498) was a Roman Catholic prelate who served as Bishop of Córdoba (1496–1498) and Bishop of Ávila (1493–1496).

Biography
In 1493, Francisco Sánchez de la Fuente was selected by the King of Spain and confirmed by Pope Alexander VI as Bishop of Ávila. In 1496, he was appointed by Pope Alexander VI as Bishop of Córdoba. He served as Bishop of Córdoba until his death in September 1498.

References

External links and additional sources
 (for Chronology of Bishops) 
 (for Chronology of Bishops) 
 (for Chronology of Bishops) 
 (for Chronology of Bishops) 

1498 deaths
15th-century Roman Catholic bishops in Castile
Bishops appointed by Pope Alexander VI